Peter Werner Zeun (born 1951) is a British retired lightweight rower.

Rowing career
Zeun was selected by Great Britain in the lightweight single sculls at the 1975 World Rowing Championships, he finished in 9th overall and 3rd in the B final. The following year he rowed at the 1976 World Rowing Championships in Villach, Austria again finishing 3rd in the B final. In 1977 he finished fourth in the B final at the 1977 World Rowing Championships in Amsterdam.

He won a gold medal at the 1978 FISA Lightweight Championships in Copenhagen with the lightweight men's eight.

He married Bronwen R. Simonds in 1981.

References

1951 births
British male rowers
World Rowing Championships medalists for Great Britain
Living people